Hubel, Hübel or Huebel is a German language topographic surname, denoting a person who lived near a hill (Middle High German hübel "hill") and may refer to:
Allison Hubel, American mechanical engineer and cryobiologist
David H. Hubel (1926–2013), Canadian American neurophysiologist 
Erich Hubel, Australian wheelchair basketballer
Herbert Huebel (1889–1950), American football player, coach, and official
Herbert Hübel (1958), Austrian lawyer and sports official
Rob Huebel (1969), American actor, comedian and writer

References 

German-language surnames
German toponymic surnames